Mr Inbetween (stylised onscreen as Mr Inbetween) is an Australian black comedy-crime drama television series which premiered on FX on 25 September 2018 in the United States, followed by Fox Showcase in Australia on 1 October 2018. The series is a serialisation of the 2005 feature film The Magician, which was created, written by and starred Scott Ryan. Ryan reprises his lead role and is also the writer for the series, which is directed by Nash Edgerton.

The program was originally commissioned for FX Australia as its first original drama production, but instead launched in Australia on Showcase following the closure of FX Australia between commission and premiere. Filming took place in various locations in Sydney.

On 9 October 2018, FX and Foxtel renewed the series for a second season which premiered on 12 September 2019. On 26 May 2020, the series was renewed for a third and final season which premiered on 25 May 2021. The series concluded on 13 July 2021, after three seasons and 26 episodes.

Premise
Set within the suburbs of Sydney, Raymond "Ray" Shoesmith (Scott Ryan) is a hitman for hire who makes a life out of balancing his criminal activities with his obligations to friends and family. He tries to be a father to Brittany (Chika Yasumura), his daughter with his ex-wife, Jacinta (Natalie Tran), a loving boyfriend to Ally (Brooke Satchwell), and a good caretaker to his terminally ill brother Bruce (Nicholas Cassim). Ray also covers for his friend Gary (Justin Rosniak) when needed, and follows orders from his boss Freddy (Damon Herriman) without question. Ray deals with criminals and monsters in his own violent way; this behaviour, however, starts to take its toll and affects his relationships.

Cast

Main characters
 Scott Ryan as Raymond "Ray" Shoesmith, a hitman known as "The Magician"
 Justin Rosniak as Gary Thomas, Ray's best friend
 Brooke Satchwell as Ally, Ray's girlfriend (seasons 1–2; guest season 3) 
 Nicholas Cassim as Bruce Shoesmith, Ray's older brother who has a motor neuron disease (seasons 1–2)
 Chika Yasumura as Brittany, Ray's daughter
 Damon Herriman as Freddy, Ray's boss

Recurring characters
 Matt Nable as Dave, another hitman and Ray's friend
 Natalie Tran as Jacinta, Ray's ex-wife
 Lizzie Schebesta as Tatiana, Gary's wife
 Bryn Chapman Parish as James
 David Michôd as Peter (seasons 1–2)
 Kenny Graham as Bill Shoesmith, Ray's father (seasons 2–3)
 Rose Riley as Michele (seasons 2–3)
 Season 1
 Jackson Tozer as Vasilli
 Firass Dirani as Davros
 Edmund Lembke-Hogan as Nick
 Season 2
 Eddie Baroo as Kevin
 Josh McConville as Alex
 Kieran Darcy-Smith as Vinnie Williams
 Ben Oxenbould as Dirk
 Mirrah Foulkes as Kate Hall
 Season 3
 Sam Cotton as Adam Kelsey
 Jackson Heywood as Matty
 Tessa de Josselin as Karen
 Jeremy Sims as Rafael, a criminal kingpin
 Brad McMurray as Cullen
 Emily Barclay as Zoe

Guest characters
 Season 1
 Josh Quong Tart as Luke Henson
 Benedict Hardie as Lefty
 Season 2
 Daniel Amalm as Sam
 Hugo Johnstone-Burt as Jason
 Nash Edgerton as Trent
 Clayton Jacobson as Benny
 Season 3
 Ian Roberts as Graham
 Justine Clarke as Meaghan Clarke
 Daniel Henshall as Kenny

Episodes

Season 1 (2018)

Season 2 (2019)

Season 3 (2021)

Reception

Critical response
Mr Inbetween received critical acclaim for its writing and performances. On Rotten Tomatoes, the first season has an approval rating of 90% based on 20 reviews and an average rating of 7/10. The site's critical consensus reads, "Mr Inbetweens familiar setup is quickly forgiven thanks to its expertly built tension and a mesmerizing performance from Scott Ryan". On Metacritic, the first season has a score of 75 out of 100 based on 11 critics, indicating "generally favorable reviews".

The Hollywood Reporter called it "One of 2018's best shows... Creator-writer-actor Scott Ryan and director Nash Edgerton deliver a tour de force that gets a lot done in very little time". Entertainment Weekly named it one of Fall 2018's Must-Watch TV, praising the show's dark comedic tone; "Ryan radiates a casual toughness, like he's cheerfully counting your most breakable bones. Mr. Inbetween gets wilder as it goes along, until the season finale becomes a fully surreal, Fargo-ish tale of a hit gone way wrong". The Globe and Mail called it "a little masterpiece of quiet, compulsively watchable comedy/drama. There are no big ideas here, but the strength of its small-scale narrative is breathtaking". 

The New York Times included it on their "Best of Fall 2018 TV" list, stating "The balance between dread and deadpan laughs is adroitly maintained, and there's an appealing casual improvisatory vibe". The Boston Globe said of the show's first season, "The killer with a heart of gold isn't a new trope, of course; viewers have repeatedly been put in the position of moral compromise in the past two decades, most recently with HBO's Barry. But Mr. Inbetween gives it a fresh and funny going over".

In 2019, Season 2 premiered to additional positive reviews. Alan Sepinwall of Rolling Stone praised it, stating "The huge improvement from an already solid first season to this tremendous second one has me wondering if Mr. Inbetween has another big leap in it — or if spending even more time in Ray Shoesmith's world might force Ryan, and us, to start empathizing too much with this very dangerous man". Ben Travers from IndieWire said, "Pair these deeper thoughts with sharp dialogue, an ideally grubby aesthetic, and strong supporting characters, and Mr. Inbetween ends up a rewarding experience worth much more exploration". Screen Rant gave it a positive review, saying "Season 2 elevates the series on nearly every level, from Ryan's writing and acting to the performances of the supporting cast and the directing of Nash Edgerton". The Hollywood Reporter called the "exceptional" second season "a brilliantly taut drama — which jams more into its 23 to 25 minute episodes than most hourlong American dramas — with a lingering emotional after-effect".

The third and final season, which premiered in 2021, received critical praise as well. The New York Times ranked it on their list of "Best TV Shows of 2021" calling it "a smart, deadpan, quietly daft deconstruction of tough-guy clichés". Critic Mike Hale of The New York Times praised it as "a small marvel of sustained tone. The slightest overstatement or sentimentality could capsize the delicate sendup of tough-guy clichés, but Ryan (who writes all the episodes and plays the protagonist, Ray Shoesmith) rarely makes a wrong step".

Awards and nominations 
Mr Inbetween has been nominated and won the following awards:

Screen Producers Australia Awards

Logie Awards

Australian Academy of Cinema and Television Arts (AACTA) Awards

Australian Directors' Guild Awards

Australian Screen Sound Guild

 Casting Guild of Australia Awards

 The Equity Ensemble Awards

 Australian Writers' Guild Awards

 Screen Producers Australia Awards

Note

References

External links
  at FX
 

2018 Australian television series debuts
2021 Australian television series endings
2010s Australian crime television series
2020s Australian crime television series
2010s Australian drama television series
2020s Australian drama television series
Australian comedy-drama television series
FX Networks original programming
Showcase (Australian TV channel) original programming
Television shows filmed in Australia
Television shows set in Australia
Works about contract killers